Suure-Kambja is a village in Kambja Parish, Tartu County in eastern Estonia.

Suure-Kambja is the birthplace of Estonian politician Karl Eduard Kompus (1903–1942).

References

 

Villages in Tartu County
Kreis Dorpat